Bucculatrix polymniae is a moth in the family Bucculatricidae. It is found in North America, where it has been recorded from Kentucky and Ohio. It was first described in 1963 by Annette Frances Braun.

The wingspan is about 6–7 mm. 

The larvae feed on Polymnia uvedalia. They mine the leaves of their host plant.

References

Natural History Museum Lepidoptera generic names catalog

Bucculatricidae
Moths described in 1963
Moths of North America
Taxa named by Annette Frances Braun